Scott William Inglis "Billy" Sinclair (born 21 March 1943) is a Scottish former professional footballer who played as an wing-half.

Club career
Sinclair started his career with Greenock Morton before moving to English side Chelsea in 1964. Having only made one appearance for Chelsea, he moved to Northern Ireland to sign for Glentoran. Due to an arrangement between Glentoran and American side Detroit Cougars, Sinclair played ten games in the 1967 United Soccer Association season.

He returned to his native Scotland in 1968, spending one season with Kilmarnock, where he made ten appearances, before a return to Glentoran the following season. He had a spell with Linfield before moving to Australia to play for Club Marconi. His last club was Sligo Rovers, before going into management.

Coaching career
While at Sligo Rovers, Sinclair assumed the position of player-manager, before briefly managing Glenavon. He also managed Cliftonville between 1985 and 1992.

Personal life
Sinclair was diagnosed with Alzheimer's disease in 2020. His son has spoken out about the treatment of ex-footballers, and has called for better welfare support, as well as the disease to be treated as an industrial injury.

References

1943 births
Living people
Footballers from Glasgow
Scottish footballers
Association football midfielders
United Soccer Association players
Greenock Morton F.C. players
Chelsea F.C. players
Glentoran F.C. players
Kilmarnock F.C. players
Linfield F.C. players
Marconi Stallions FC players
Sligo Rovers F.C. players
Sligo Rovers F.C. managers
Glenavon F.C. managers
Cliftonville F.C. managers
Scottish expatriate footballers
Scottish expatriate sportspeople in Australia
Expatriate soccer players in Australia
Scottish expatriate sportspeople in Ireland
Expatriate association footballers in the Republic of Ireland